Gerrit Solleveld (born 8 June 1961 in De Lier) is a former Dutch professional road bicycle racer, who won two stages in the Tour de France.

Major results

1982
1st World Amateur 100km Team Time Trial Championship
1st Olympia's Tour
1983
 National Amateur Road Race Championship
1985
1st Stage 4 Tour de France
1st Profronde van Surhuisterveen
1986
1st  Intermediate sprints classification Tour de France
1st Profronde van Pijnacker
1st Delta Profronde
1st Steenwijk
1987
1st Groot-Ammers
1st Tour Méditerranéen
1988
1st Profronde van Wateringen
1st GP Libération
1989
1st Gent–Wevelgem
1st Apeldoorn
1990
1st stage 5 Tour de France
1st Acht van Chaam
1st Delta Profronde
1991
1st Noordwijk-aan-zee

External links 

1961 births
Living people
Dutch male cyclists
Dutch Tour de France stage winners
People from De Lier
UCI Road World Champions (elite men)
UCI Road World Championships cyclists for the Netherlands
Cyclists from South Holland
20th-century Dutch people
21st-century Dutch people